The 2017 Shenzhen Longhua Open was a professional tennis tournament played on hard courts. It was the first (men) and second (women) editions of the tournament which was part of the 2017 ATP Challenger Tour and the 2017 ITF Women's Circuit. It took place in Shenzhen, China between 30 October and 12 November 2017.

Men's singles main-draw entrants

Seeds

 1 Rankings are as of 23 October 2017.

Other entrants
The following players received wildcards into the singles main draw:
  Te Rigele
  Wang Chuhan
  Wu Yibing
  Zhang Zhizhen

The following players received entry from the qualifying draw:
  Riccardo Ghedin
  Hubert Hurkacz
  Marinko Matosevic
  Miliaan Niesten

The following players received entry as lucky losers:
  Naoki Nakagawa
  Kaichi Uchida

Women's singles main-draw entrants

Seeds

 1 Rankings are as of 30 October 2017.

Other entrants
The following players received wildcards into the singles main draw:
  Cao Siqi
  Wang Xinyu
  Xu Yifan
  Zhang Ying

The following players received entry from the qualifying draw:
  Gai Ao
  Ingrid Neel
  Sun Ziyue
  Ye Qiuyu

Champions

Men's singles

 Radu Albot def.  Hubert Hurkacz 7–6(8–6), 6–7(3–7), 6–4.

Women's singles

 Carol Zhao def.  Liu Fangzhou, 7–5, 6–2

Men's doubles

 Sriram Balaji /  Vishnu Vardhan def.  Austin Krajicek /  Jackson Withrow 7–6(7–3), 7–6(7–3).

Women's doubles

 Jacqueline Cako /  Nina Stojanović def.  Shuko Aoyama /  Yang Zhaoxuan, 6–4, 6–2

External links
2017 Shenzhen Longhua Open at ITFtennis.com

2017 ATP Challenger Tour
2017 ITF Women's Circuit
2017 in Chinese tennis
Shenzhen Longhua Open